Dear Heart is a 1964 American romantic-comedy film starring Glenn Ford and Geraldine Page as lonely middle-aged people who fall in love at a hotel convention. It was directed by Delbert Mann, from a screenplay by Tad Mosel. Its theme song "Dear Heart" was nominated for the Academy Award for Best Original Song.

Plot
Evie Jackson (Geraldine Page) is a middle-aged, single postmaster from small-town Ohio who is attending a postmasters' convention at a New York City hotel. Outgoing, honest, and somewhat tactless, she has many friends but pines for a romantic relationship, one that will be more meaningful than the flings she has had with married conventioneers in previous years. She uses various means to make herself feel less lonely and more important, such as sending herself a welcome message and having herself paged in the hotel lobby.

Harry Mork (Glenn Ford) is a middle-aged, womanizing, former traveling salesman for a greeting card company, who now wishes to settle down. Harry has accepted a promotion to an office job in New York City, and has gotten engaged to Phyllis (Angela Lansbury), a middle-aged, widowed housewife from Altoona, Pennsylvania. Harry is staying alone in the same hotel as Evie while he starts his new job and finds an apartment, where Phyllis, who is still back in Altoona, will later join him. While Harry is checking in, Phyllis's son Patrick (Michael Anderson Jr.) suddenly arrives, seeking to bond with his new father. Harry is surprised to find that Patrick is not the young boy he had expected based on a photograph, but instead is an 18-year-old bohemian with a beard (which, it is later revealed, got him expelled from boarding school). Harry is mildly annoyed by Patrick's unexpected arrival and embarrassed by his casual attitude toward women, sex, and nudity, particularly after Patrick moves into Harry's hotel room with his purportedly platonic female friend Émile Zola Bernkrand (Joanna Crawford).

Evie first meets Harry when they are forced to share a dinner table in the crowded hotel restaurant, but Harry is more interested in buxom blonde June Loveland (Barbara Nichols), a clerk in the hotel gift shop, than he is in the overly friendly Evie, and he quickly makes an excuse to leave for a tryst with June. Returning to the hotel, Harry meets Evie again in the lobby, where she is upset after escaping from the unwanted sexual advances of a strange man outside her room. Harry escorts her back to her room, and they make plans to go to the Statue of Liberty the next morning. However, the next morning, Patrick shows up again wanting to spend the day with Harry, so Harry breaks his date with Evie to look at apartments with Patrick and Zola. A disappointed Evie spends the day (after attending a postmaster seminar and party) with a trio of older spinster postmasters, but cheers up when Harry returns, proves that he left a message for her (at the front desk) about the change of plans, and offers to take her to dinner and show her the apartment he rented in Greenwich Village.

Evie optimistically thinks Harry is planning to reveal that the apartment is intended for the two of them to occupy, and she is crushed when she realizes that Harry is planning to live there with his soon-to-be wife Phyllis. Harry takes Evie back to the hotel and impulsively kisses her, but Phyllis unexpectedly arrives from Altoona. So Harry goes to stay with her in the hotel across the street while Evie sadly arranges to return to Ohio the next day. Harry soon discovers that Phyllis does not want to live a happy, domestic life with him in the future in the old-fashioned apartment he rented. Instead, she wants to live in modern hotels with room service, where she won't have to cook or clean, and she wants to sleep in separate beds. She also wants Harry to be a father figure to Patrick so she won't have to deal with him and his teenage problems. Harry realizes that he truly loves Evie and that Patrick and Phyllis need to spend more time with each other rather than with him. He breaks his engagement and happily reunites with Evie at the busy train station just before she would have returned home.

Cast
 Glenn Ford as Harry Mork
 Geraldine Page as Evie Jackson
 Angela Lansbury as Phyllis
 Michael Anderson Jr. as Patrick
 Charles Drake as Frank Taylor
 Richard Deacon as Cruikshank
 Barbara Nichols as June Loveland
 Mary Wickes as Miss Fox
 Ruth McDevitt as Miss Tait
 Alice Pearce as Miss Moore
 Joanna Crawford as Émile Zola Bernkrand
 Patricia Barry as Mitchell
 Neva Patterson as Connie Templeton
 Ken Lynch as The Masher
 Hal Smith as party reveler

Production
Dear Heart was written by Tad Mosel, from his own story. He originally wrote it as a teleplay for a May 1957 Westinghouse Studio One episode, titled "The Out-Of-Towners", co-starring E.G. Marshall and Eileen Heckart.

The film had a budget of about $1.8 million. Principal shooting occurred from October 3 to November 22, 1963. Filming of the opening and closing scenes in Penn Station took advantage of just-commenced demolition process of the above-ground structures.

It was Geraldine Page's first role as a leading lady. As production began, Glenn Ford's long-term relationship with actress Hope Lange was ending, and she married producer Alan Pakula, leaving Ford heartbroken. Although production of Dear Heart was generally a positive one, Ford could not stop brooding over Lange. Angela Lansbury took the role of the materialistic, good-hearted Phyllis because it gave her an opportunity to work with Geraldine Page.

Henry Mancini was hired to compose music for the film. Mancini felt such a gentle romantic film deserved a theme song. He quickly wrote music for the song, but it lacked lyrics. Mancini contacted Johnny Mercer, who was unavailable. So Mancini turned to Jay Livingston and Ray Evans. The lyricists read the script, and came up with the lyrics and title for the song based on their reading of Geraldine Page's character. The film's original title was "The Out-of-Towners", but Jay Livingston said he changed the title to Dear Heart when Martin Manulis heard the theme song.

Warner Brothers was uncertain about when to release the film. Mancini, who had a 50% interest in the film's theme song with Larry Shayne, asked studio head Jack L. Warner to release the film so that it would qualify for the March 1965 Academy Awards. Warner agreed to release it for a week in Los Angeles (which, under Academy rules, would qualify it for the Oscars), if Mancini and Shayne would pay for the local advertising. Because this would cost only $10,000, Mancini and Shayne agreed to do so.

The film premiered on December 3, 1964 in Los Angeles, to qualify it for the 1964 awards season. It made its general release premiere at Radio City Music Hall in New York City on March 8, 1965.

Reception
The film received little attention. Bosley Crowther, writing for The New York Times, called it "a stale, dull and humorless pretension at what its producers dare to describe as 'gay, sophisticated comedy,' and it makes almost scandalous misuse of the recognized talents of Geraldine Page." Eleanor Perry, writing for Life, felt that, although the film was aimed at average people, it was condescending and patronizing to them.

Writing in 2008, Leonard Maltin felt it had "excellent characterizations" and a solid supporting cast. Film historians Rob Edelman and Audrey Kupferberg felt Lansbury's performance was thoughtful.

Dear Heart holds a 33% rating on Rotten Tomatoes based on 6 reviews.

Awards and nominations

See also
 List of American films of 1964

References

Bibliography
 Edelman, Rob and Kupferberg, Audrey E. Angela Lansbury: A Life on Stage and Screen. Thorndike, Maine: G.K. Hall & Co., 1996.
 Ford, Peter. Glenn Ford: A Life. Madison, Wisc.: University of Wisconsin Press, 2011.
 Maltin, Leonard. Leonard Maltin's 2009 Movie Guide. New York: Plume/Penguin, 2008.
 Mancini, Henry and Lees, Gene. Did They Mention the Music? New York: Cooper Square Press, 2001.
 Matthews, Charles. Oscar A to Z: A Complete Guide to More Than 2,400 Movies Nominated for Academy Awards. New York: Doubleday, 1995.
 Monush, Barry. Screen World Presents the Encyclopedia of Hollywood Film Actors. New York: Applause Theatre and Cinema Books, 2003.
 Sackett, Susan and Rovins, Marcia. Hollywood Sings!: An Inside Look at Sixty Years of Academy Award-Nominated Songs. New York: Billboard Books, 1995.
 Shelley, Peter. Grande Dame Guignol Cinema: A History of Hag Horror From Baby Jane to Mother. Jefferson, N.C.: McFarland & Company, 2009.

External links
 
 
 
 

1964 films
1964 romantic comedy films
American black-and-white films
American romantic comedy films
1960s English-language films
Films based on television plays
Films directed by Delbert Mann
Films scored by Henry Mancini
Films set in hotels
Films set in New York City
Films shot in New York City
Warner Bros. films
1960s American films